Shake It Paradise is the first studio album of Japanese singer Toshinobu Kubota, released on September 10, 1986. Under the label, Kubota released his first single, "Shitsui no Downtown" in June 1986, followed by "Time" in December. Both songs were well received by radio, placing fifty-three and thirty-five on the Oricon Singles Chart. "Shake It Paradise" peaked at number twenty-two and remained on the Oricon Albums Chart for seven consecutive weeks. Shake It Paradise became certified platinum.

Track listing
These are English tracklistings, then Japanese.

Shake It Paradise
Missing

To The Party

Somebody Sorrow
Dedicate (TO M.E.)

Personnel
Arranged By – Kubota Band (tracks: 3), 中村哲* (tracks: 5, 10), 武部聡志* (tracks: 1, 9), 杉山卓夫* (tracks: 2, 4, 6 to 8, 11)
Arranged By [All Vocals & Chorus], Lead Vocals – Toshinobu Kubota
Artwork By [Art Direction & Design] – Akio Nimbari
Artwork By [Design] – Tomoaki Sakai
Bass [Electric, Synthesizer] – Kitaro Nakamura
Chorus – Kumi Saito (tracks: 3, 6, 8, 9), Tomoko Yoshikawa (tracks: 3, 6, 8, 9), Toshinobu Kubota, Yuko Otaki (tracks: 3, 6, 8, 9)
Drums, Electronic Drums [Simmons] – Nobuo Eguchi
Engineer [Assistant] – Masaru Arai, Michihide Nagashima, Shojiro Watanabe, Tetsuya Ikeda
Engineer [Recording & Mixing] – Takashi Shimizu
Engineer [Recording] – Akio Ikawa, Susumu Yamazaki, Teruaki Igarashi
Executive Producer – Hidenori Taga, Hiroshi Inagaki
Guitar [Electric] – Ichiro Hada, Yuji Toriyama (tracks: 1, 9)
Lyrics By – 川村真澄* (tracks: 1, 5 to 8, 10, 11), 久保田利伸* (tracks: 2 to 4, 9)
Mastered By [Re-mastered] – Doug Sax
Music By – 羽田一郎* (tracks: 2, 3, 6, 10), 久保田利伸*
Other [Assistant Director] – Nobuo Morinaga
Other [Director] – Kazuyasu Honma
Percussion – Makoto Kimura (tracks: 1, 9), Motoya Hamaguchi (tracks: 5, 10)
Photography – Joji Ide
Piano – Takao Sugiyama
Producer – Hitoshi Ishitani, Tatsufumi Inaba
Saxophone, Woodwind [Reed] – Satoshi Nakamura (tracks: 5, 10)
Strings – Hiiro Group*
Synthesizer – Satoshi Nakamura (tracks: 5, 10), Satoshi Takebe (tracks: 1, 9), Takao Sugiyama
Technician [Operator] – Hironori Hoki* (tracks: 2 to 4, 6 to 8), Itaru Sakota (tracks: 5, 10), Tetsuo Otake* (tracks: 1, 9)

References

1986 albums
Toshinobu Kubota albums
Sony Music albums